Eugnathichthys is a genus of distichodontid fishes found in the Congo basin in Africa. They are specialized predators that feed on the fins of other fish.

Species
The currently recognized species in this genus are:
 Eugnathichthys eetveldii Boulenger, 1898
 Eugnathichthys macroterolepis Boulenger, 1899
 Eugnathichthys virgatus Stiassny, Denton & Monsembula Iyaba, 2013

References

Distichodontidae
Taxa named by George Albert Boulenger
Fish of Africa